The Red Armenian Army (RAA), also known as the Armenian Red Army, was a small militant organization, which organized a single unsuccessful attack against the Turkish Consul General, Kemalettin Demirer, on 1 July 1982 in Rotterdam, Netherlands. The group used a gun in the assassination attempt.

The Armenian Red Army has not claimed any attacks in over two decades and is presumed to be disbanded and inactive.

References

External links
 The Armenian red army attacked a diplomatic target (archive)

Armenian militant groups
Failed assassination attempts in Europe
Defunct Armenian paramilitary organizations
Guerrilla organizations